Theodore Howard Somervell OBE, FRCS (16 April 1890 – 23 January 1975) was an English surgeon, mountaineer, painter and missionary who was a member of two expeditions to Mount Everest in the 1920s, and then spent nearly 40 years working as a doctor in India. In 1924 he was awarded an Olympic Gold Medal by Pierre de Coubertin for his achievements in mountaineering (Alpinism).

Early life
Somervell was born in Kendal, Westmorland, England to a well-off family which owned a shoe-manufacturing business founded by two SOMERVELL brothers in Kendal in 1845, that survives to this day, K Shoes. He attended Rugby School, and at the age of eighteen joined the Fell and Rock Climbing Club, beginning an interest in climbing, art and mountaineering which would last a lifetime. After completing his schooling, he studied at Gonville and Caius College, Cambridge where he developed his strong Christian faith and gained First Class Honours in the Natural Sciences Tripos. He then began training as a surgeon at University College Hospital; eventually graduating in 1921 after his training had been interrupted by the First World War. He married Margaret Hope Simpson (1899–1993), daughter of Sir James Hope Simpson, the general manager of the Bank of Liverpool. With Margaret he had three sons, James, David, and Hugh.

World War I
Between 1915 and 1918 Somervell served in France with the Royal Army Medical Corps.  He was commissioned as a lieutenant with the West Lancashire Casualty Clearing Station on 17 May 1915, having previously been a member of the University of London Officer Training Corps. He was Mentioned in Despatches, but the horrors of the war had a profound effect on him. During the Battle of the Somme in 1916 he was one of four surgeons working in a tent, while hundreds of wounded men lay dying on stretchers outside. On short breaks from surgery, he spoke with some of the dying men, and noted that not one asked to be treated ahead of the others. The experience turned Somervell into a pacifist, a belief he continued to hold for the rest of his life. He relinquished his commission in 1921, by which time he held the rank of captain.

First Everest expedition

By 1922, Somervell had shown himself a capable climber in the Lake District and the Alps, where he climbed in particular with Bentley Beetham, a climber, photographer and ornithologist from Darlington. Somervell was invited to join the 1922 British Everest expedition. During the expedition, he formed a close friendship with George Mallory, and the two famously read Shakespeare to one another in their tent at night. By 18 May, Somervell, Mallory and two other climbers and several Sherpa porters had established camp on the North Col, at 7020 metres the highest man had ever camped, and prepared to make the first ever attempt on the summit of Everest along the North Ridge and then the Northeast Ridge. Their plan had been to establish a further camp at around 8000 m, but in the thin air it proved impossible to climb as quickly as they hoped, and they were forced to send the Sherpas down and make camp on a cramped ledge at around 7600 m. The following day, exhausted and suffering from frostbite, they reached a height of 8170 m before turning round, realising that they had no hope of reaching the summit before dark. They had set a world altitude record, but such is the scale of Everest that they had not even reached the junction with the Northeast Ridge.

Over the next few days a second group of climbers, Geoffrey Bruce and George Finch, using oxygen, made a second unsuccessful attempt on the summit. With the weakened climbers back at Base Camp (only Somervell was considered fit to continue by the expedition doctor), and the weather becoming worse with the imminent arrival of the monsoon, Somervell and Mallory argued that the team should make a third attempt, against the advice of Charles Bruce, the expedition leader. On 7 June, Somervell was part of a party of four British climbers leading fifteen Sherpas through waist-deep fresh snow on the slopes below the North Col. An avalanche occurred, killing seven Sherpas. Somervell was shocked, and felt great guilt that it was the Sherpas who had paid the price for the poor judgement of the British climbers, writing

Travels in India

With the expedition over, Somervell set out to see India, travelling from the far north to Cape Comorin. He was shocked by the poverty he saw, and in particular the poor medical facilities. At the main hospital of the south Travancore medical mission in Neyyoor he found a single surgeon struggling to cope with a long queue of waiting patients, and immediately offered to assist. On his return to Britain, he abandoned his promising medical career, and announced his intention to work in India permanently after his next attempt on Everest. Most of his famous paintings sold today are from his travels in various part of India. Even though most of his time was in Kerala where many landmarks to his name still remain.

Second Everest expedition

Somervell returned to Everest with the 1924 expedition. Throughout the expedition he was dogged by a sore throat, hacking cough and occasional difficulty breathing, but remained one of the strongest members of the team. The team's first summit attempt was aborted due to bad weather, and during the retreat four porters who had refused to descend the avalanche prone slopes below the North Col were left sitting on a ledge overnight. Somervell led the rescue operation the next morning, undertaking a delicate traverse of the avalanche slope to reach the four men.

Once the team had regrouped and high camps re-established, Somervell made the next summit attempt with Edward Norton. Setting out from Camp VI at 6:40 a.m. on 4 June, they made a traverse of the North Face below the Northeast Ridge, thereby by-passing the now notorious Second Step. Somervell, racked by coughing fits, decided at noon that he could go no further. Norton continued alone for a short distance before judging that snow conditions were too dangerous for a lone, unroped climber. They had reached an altitude of 8570 m; a record which would not be broken, with certainty, until 1952.

On the descent, the throat problems which had plagued Somervell reached a climax, and he found himself fighting for his life as some flesh came loose and caused him to choke. Unable to speak or attract Norton's attention he sat down in the snow to die. He later wrote of what happened next;

The obstruction was the entire mucous membrane lining Somervell's throat, which had become badly frostbitten in the cold air.

Medical career

Somervell worked as a surgeon with the London Missionary Society Boys Brigade Hospital (now known as LMS Boys Brigade Hospital ) at Kundara during 1923–1949. There was a separate operation theatre for him in that hospital. He had donated £1,000 to the hospital. In 1940 he published a book of his experiences entitled "Knife and Life in India".

Somervell became an associate professor of surgery at Vellore Christian Medical College in 1949, a post he would hold until his retirement in 1961. He was appointed an Officer of the Order of the British Empire (OBE) in the 1953 New Year Honours. On his retirement in 1961 he returned to England, and was President of the Alpine Club for three years.

Artist

Somervell painted many hundreds if not thousands of paintings and has been described as a compulsive sketcher and painter. The Himalyan Club identified some 600 titles, with at least 200 of them being representations of the Himalaya or Tibet. 126 of these relate to the 1922 and 1924 expeditions, many of which were exhibited at the Royal Geographical Society in April 1925 and at the Redfern Gallery, London in 1926. He exhibited almost annually at the Lake Artists Society (LAS) exhibitions in the English Lake District after his return to England.

Many of his watercolours are painted on what has been described as no more than 'cheap' brown or off-white wrapping paper. However, given that Somervell was a sometime commercial artist, this oft repeated tale is largely apocryphal. He used this style of paper as early as 1913 and was still using it in the 1970s. It particularly lends itself to the dun colours of the Tibetan landscape. Other artists such as John Sell Cotman and Edith Collingwood used a similar paper. He often used watercolour and body colour in preference to watercolour alone. He also used pastel either alone or with watercolour. Watercolour seems to have been his favoured medium in Tibet, the Himalaya and India.

The Alpine Club in London possesses thirty paintings by Somervell Abbot Hall Gallery in Kendal, England has thirteen Somervell watercolours and one oil painting whilst the Royal Geographical Society hold a large watercolour, Gaurisankar from the North West, dated 1924 although this may in fact be a painting of Menlungtse.

Somervell's paintings of the Himalaya and of Westmorland were exhibited at the Abbot Hall Gallery in April 1979.

Death and commemoration
Somervell died in Ambleside in 1975. A teaching hospital at Karakonam, south of Trivandrum – the Dr. Somervell Memorial CSI Medical College Hospital – is named in his honour.

A collection of his mountaineering equipment and other effects, including his 1924 Winter Olympics gold medal, and his sketchbooks and paintings, now in the possession of his grandson, was shown on an episode of the BBC Television programme Antiques Roadshow in April 2022.

Awards and honours
In 1924 he was one of twenty-one recipients of a gold medal awarded at the Winter VIII Olympiade in Chamonix for achievements in mountaineering. Pierre de Coubertin, founder of the modern Olympics admired the ethos behind mountaineering and wanted to recognise exceptional achievements with an Olympic medal

Somervell's work as a doctor in India was officially recognised in the 1939 New Year Honours, when he was awarded a Kaisar-I-Hind Medal, first class.

He was appointed an Officer of the Order of the British Empire (OBE) in the 1953 New Year Honours.

References

External links
 
 

1890 births
1975 deaths
English mountain climbers
British mountain climbers
English Olympic medallists
British surgeons
20th-century English painters
English male painters
English watercolourists
English landscape painters
English Protestant missionaries
Protestant missionaries in India
Royal Army Medical Corps officers
Fellows of the Royal College of Surgeons
Officers of the Order of the British Empire
Presidents of the Alpine Club (UK)
Recipients of the Kaisar-i-Hind Medal
Olympic gold medallists for Great Britain
People educated at Rugby School
Alumni of Gonville and Caius College, Cambridge
British Army personnel of World War I
People from Kendal
Medalists at the 1924 Summer Olympics
Christian medical missionaries
20th-century surgeons
20th-century English male artists